A mirror fugue is a fugue, or rather two fugues, one of which is the mirror image of the other. It is as though a mirror were placed above or below an existing fugue, producing inversions of each interval in each part, as well as inverting the position of the parts within the texture, so that, for example, the topmost part in one fugue is inverted to produce the lowest part in the other. This is well demonstrated by the two four-part fugues of Contrapunctus 12 in The Art of Fugue.

The two three-part fugues of Contrapunctus 13 exhibit a similar relationship to each other, but this cannot strictly be called a mirror fugue, since the position of each inverted part is not itself inverted in the texture, SAB becoming not BAS, but BSA.

See also 
Fugue
Mirror canon

References 

Polyphonic form